Kvutza, kevutza or kevutzah ( "group") is a communal settlement among Jews, primarily in pre-state Israel, the word was used in reference to communal life. First there were kvutzot (plural of kvutza) in the sense of groups of young people with similar ideals living and working together; and after 1909 and for many years to follow, in the sense of collective settlements created by such groups. The kvutza collective settlement was distinguished from the kibbutz settlement in that it intended to remain small and mainly agricultural, whereas the larger kibbutzim were intended to expand with agriculture, industry and other productive pursuits. Later, as the distinction disappeared, most kvutzot were renamed kibbutzim. Notable example: Degania Alef.

Further reading
Ideological motives in the formation of kvutzot in the days of the Second Aliyah

Israeli culture
Intentional communities in Israel
Agricultural labor
Agriculture in Israel
Cooperatives in Israel
Hebrew words and phrases
Rural community development
Socialism
Types of populated places